Freda Hands (4 March 1918 – 3 February 2007) was a British painter. Her work was part of the painting event in the art competition at the 1948 Summer Olympics. Hands was most notable for her calligraphy. Works include The Book of the Baptism Service of Prince Charles.

References

1918 births
2007 deaths
20th-century British painters
British women painters
Olympic competitors in art competitions
People from London
British calligraphers
Women calligraphers